HMNZS Pukaki is a name which has been used by three ships of the Royal New Zealand Navy:
 , was a frigate, 1948–66
 , was a  patrol vessel, 1975–91, pennant number P3568

Royal New Zealand Navy ship names